The Collegio Carlo Alberto is a private research and teaching institution, located in the city of Turin, northern Italy, in the province of Turin. The institution was created in 2004 as a joint initiative of the Compagnia di San Paolo and the University of Turin, at first located in Moncalieri. Its mission is to foster research and education in social sciences. Acting president of the Collegio is Giorgio Barba Navaretti.

The Collegio's research community consists of full-time junior faculty hired on the international academic job market, faculty of the University of Turin, and visiting scholars. They conduct research within the social sciences with both empirical and theoretical emphasis. 
Research interactions are fostered by seminar series and scientific conferences. Since 2006 the Collegio has hosted hundreds of international speakers, including Nobel laureates, and leaders of financial institutions.

The Collegio coordinates the Allievi Honors Program, organizes five one-year master's degree programs (Economics, Economics and Complexity, Finance, Insurance and Risk Management, Public Policy and Social Change), and hosts two doctoral programs of the University of Turin. 
English is the operating language of the Collegio.

Historically, prior to the 1990s, the Collegio Carlo Alberto referred to a Piedmont boys boarding school.  The school has since closed, but the building retains its name.

Notes

External links 
 Official website

Research institutes in Italy
Economic research institutes
Educational institutions established in 2004
University of Turin
Universities in Italy
Education in Turin
2004 establishments in Italy